Jari Naranen is a Finnish former paralympic athlete. He represented Finland at the 1988 Summer Paralympics held in Seoul, South Korea and he won the silver medal in the men's 10,000 m A6A8A9L4 event.

References

External links 
 

Living people
Year of birth missing (living people)
Place of birth missing (living people)
Paralympic athletes of Finland
Athletes (track and field) at the 1988 Summer Paralympics
Paralympic silver medalists for Finland
Medalists at the 1988 Summer Paralympics
Paralympic medalists in athletics (track and field)
Finnish male long-distance runners
Paralympic long-distance runners
20th-century Finnish people
21st-century Finnish people